Antonino Valsecchi, as secolo Antonio Valsecchi and in Latin Antoninus Valsecchius (25 December 1708 - 15 March 1791) was an Italian Roman Catholic apologist, member of the Dominican order. For thirty years, he was professor of theology at the University of Padua.

Biography 
Antonio was born in Verona. He entered a Dominican seminary as a youth, and by 1726 took the name of Antonino. After studying philosophy and theology in Venice, while residing in the Convent of the Gesuati there he gained a position teaching philosopy. In 1757, he was appointed professor of theology at Padua, a position he held for the remainder of his life.

In 1760 he was appointed to the Accademia dei Ricovrati. His works not only commented on the Summa Theologiae but also criticized the rising Rationalism of the Enlightenment.

He died in Padua, and was buried in the cloister of the monastery attached to Sant'Agostino, Padua.

Works 
 Orazione in morte di Apostolo Zeno, poeta e storico cesareo, Venice, Simone Occhi, 1750; Milano 1751.
 Oratio ad theologiam, Padu, 1758.
 Dei fondamenti della religione e dei fonti dell'empietà, in 3 volumes, Padua, 1765.
 De las fuentes de la impiedad, 1777 (Spanish publication).
 Of the Foundations of Religion, and the Fountains of Impiety, 1800 (English publication).
 La religion vincitrice, 2 voll., Padua 1776, 1779.
 La verità della Chiesa cattolica romana dimostrata e difesa, Padua, 1787.
 Panegirici e discorsi, Bassano 1792 (posthumous).
 Prediche quaresimali, Venice, 1792 (posthumous).
 Praelectiones theologicae, Padua, 1805 (posthumous).
 Ritratti o vite letterarie e paralleli di G.J. Rousseau, e del signor di Voltaire, di Obbes, e di Spinosa, e vita di Pietro Bayle, Venice, 1816 (incomplete, published posthumously).

Note

Bibliography

External links 
 
 Works on Post-Reformation Digital Library

Members of the Dominican Order
18th-century Italian male writers
Christian apologists
Academic staff of the University of Padua
People from Verona